Statistics of Emperor's Cup in the 1936 season.

Overview
It was contested by 5 teams, and Keio BRB won the championship.

Results

Quarterfinals
Poseung College 10–1 Tohoku Gakuin University

Semifinals
Poseung College 4–2 Kwansei Gakuin University
Keio BRB 13–0 Nagoya Pharmaceutical College

Final

Poseung College 2–3 Keio BRB
Keio BRB won the championship.

References
 NHK

Emperor's Cup
1936 in Japanese football